Pegi Nicol MacLeod, (17 January 1904 – 12 February 1949), was a Canadian painter whose modernist self-portraits, figure studies, paintings of children, still lifes and landscapes are characterized by a fluidity of form and vibrant colour. Born Margaret Kathleen Nichol, she was a teacher, war artist and arts activist. In 1936 she became a member of the Canadian Society of Painters in Water Colour and one year later she joined the Canadian Group of Painters.

Biography 
She was born in Listowel, Ontario, to William Wallace Nichol and Myrtle Ivy Riggs. Pegi was their only child. The family moved to Ottawa in 1908 when Pegi was four where her father became principal of the Ottawa Technical School. The family lived on Frank Street and Pegi attended elementary at Cartier Street School. In 1914, when war broke out, the family moved to Toronto and Pegi attended Harbord Collegiate Institute. The Nichols returned to Ottawa after the war where Pegi finished her early education at the Ottawa Collegiate Institute.

Art education 
In 1921 MacLeod enrolled at the newly re-established Art Association of Ottawa school. She studied art under Franklin Brownell from 1922 to 1923. In 1923 she moved to Montreal to study at the École des Beaux-Arts de Montréal with Edwin Holgate. There was an emphasis on figure study and life drawing at the school. The art critic Donald Buchanan attributed her and many of her classmates' interest in the figure and portraiture to their training at the École. She was at the École des Beaux-Arts de Montréal with Paul-Émile Borduas, Lillian Freiman, Goodridge Roberts, Anne Savage, and Marian Scott, who would all go on to become established artists in their own right. In 1932 she won the Willingdon Arts Competition prize for painting.

Personal life 
She lived in Toronto from 1934 to 1937 and became good friends with Eric Brown, the first director of the National Gallery of Canada. Through Brown and his wife, Maud, Nicol developed friendships with artists in Ottawa, Toronto, and Montreal, as well as leading figures of the Canadian cultural and social establishment, including Vincent Massey and his wife, Alice Massey. She began a five-year relationship with Richard Finnie by 1925. She married Norman MacLeod on December 10, 1936. The couple then moved to New York City, but she returned annually to Fredericton, New Brunswick, where, with Lucy Jarvis in 1940, she opened an art centre for aspiring artists at the University of New Brunswick.

Artistic career 
A painter of people and landscapes, her artworks tend to reveal a sombre though joyful, reflective and humanitarian insight. In 1927 and 1928, encouraged by ethnographer Marius Barbeau, MacLeod travelled to the west and northwest of Canada. Thanks to Barbeau and to the Canadian Pacific Railway, MacLeod received free transportation on her summer trip. She painted at Morley Station in the foothills of the Rockies and among the Stoney First Nations. During her time in British Columbia MacLeod met artist Emily Carr, whose work exerted an influence on her own. Pegi stayed in Calgary with the F.G. Garbutt family who were strong supporters of the arts. The Garbutts and Pegi stayed friends for life. While there, Pegi painted a portrait of Alice Garbutt that demonstrates her increasing use of strong contour lines. MacLeod exhibited two of her portrait studies of the Stoney First Nations in the major exhibition, West Coast Art – Native and Modern organized the National Gallery of Canada in December 1927. This exhibition was, and has been, much written about and marks the first real effort to include the cultural production of Northwest Coast First Nations within the institutionalization of Canadian art history.

During her travels in 1927, MacLeod is said to have created notebooks and drawings according to her friends. However, nothing is extant to confirm this. The artist also began a draft of a book on her experiences on the west coast. It is possible that MacLeod's mother may have destroyed her book draft, Marian Scott has stated that the artist's mother destroyed much of her early work. MacLeod travelled west again in 1928 to paint in the Upper Skeena River area. She wrote about her travels for the Canadian National Railway Company's magazine and the article marks her first important foray into art writing. The solo exhibition Portraits, Landscapes and Studies by Pegi Nicol was held in Montreal at the Leonardo Society from February 4–11, 1928 and in the same year she was invited to show with the Group of Seven in Toronto. In the late 1920s, MacLeod moved from Ottawa to Montreal, and then to Toronto, where she worked on window displays for the T. Eaton Company. This position had a strong influence on her art, as demonstrated by her painting A Descent of Lilies (1935). MacLeod was art editor of The Canadian Forum from 1935 to 1936 and helped to establish the Picture Loan Society.

MacLeod was opposed to World War II, though in 1944 she accepted a commission by the National Gallery of Canada to paint many scenes depicting the Women's Division of the Armed Forces as means of showcasing the war from a female perspective.

Manhattan Cycle 
Following the Second World War she returned to depicting the scenes of New York City and in 1947 exhibited her oil and water colour paintings in Toronto, Ottawa, and Fredericton under the title "Manhattan Cycle." The Manhattan Cycle  focused on the people and scenes around MacLeod's apartment on East 88th Street in New York. She wrote to her friend and fellow artist, Isabel McLaughlin in 1946 that she had been involved with 88th street for six years and still found it fascinating. The Manhattan Cycle consisted of 110 artworks by 1947 and was the first time MacLeod exhibited a series of works in Canada focused entirely on her time in New York. The Cycle also toured to the Winnipeg School of Art at the request of Joe Plaskett and then on to Saskatoon, Calgary, Edmonton, Victoria, and Vancouver in 1948.

Selected exhibitions
A major retrospective of her work was held at Galerie Walter Klinkhoff in 1982 and a circulating retrospective exhibition was done by the Robert McLaughlin Gallery in Oshawa in 1984, along with a book of her letters and an introduction by Joan Murray.

Death 
MacLeod died of cancer in New York City in 1949, leaving a legacy of more than a thousand works of art that include many paintings and other art forms including designs for hooked rugs. Today MacLeod is a well-regarded artist whose wartime work, which includes more than one hundred oil paintings, sets her apart from many of her contemporaries.

See also 
 Canadian artist
 Woman artists
 Canadian official war artists
 War artist
 War art

External links 
 Canadian Women Artists History Initiative
 Canadian War Museum
 The Canadian Encyclopedia
 Gallery 78: biography and examples of her paintings
 National Gallery of Canada
Laura Brandon fonds at the National Gallery of Canada, Ottawa, Ontario
Ruth Comfort Jackson fonds at the National Gallery of Canada
Madge Smith fonds at the National Gallery of Canada
 Pegi Nicol MacLeod, Lethbridge College Buchanan Art Collection

Further reading

Secondary sources 
"About Face: Portraits and Other Pictures." Oshawa: The Robert McLaughlin Gallery, 2005.
Brandon, Laura (2005). Pegi by Herself: The Life of Pegi Nicol MacLeod. Montreal and Kingston: McGill-Queen's University Press. .
Burant, Jim (2022). "Pegi Nicol MacLeod". Ottawa Art & Artists: An Illustrated History. Toronto: Art Canada Institute 
Murray, Joan (1984). "Daffodils in winter : the life and letters of Pegi Nicol MacLeod, 1904–1949." Moonbeam, ON: Penumbra Press. .

Tippett, Maria (1992.) By A Lady. Toronto: Viking Canada.  .

Writings by Pegi Nicol MacLeod 
MacLeod, Pegi Nichol (Nicol). "Adventure in Murals." Maritime Art 2.2 (Dec. 1941).
MacLeod, Pegi Nichol (Nicol). [Illustrations: Decorations by Pegi Nichol Macleod] Canadian Nation 2.2 (May-Jun. 1929): 3,5,18.
MacLeod, Pegi Nichol (Nicol). [Illustrations: Decorations by Pegi Nichol] Canadian Nation 2.1 (Mar-Apr. 1929): 3,15.
MacLeod, Pegi Nichol (Nicol). [Illustrations: Decorations by Pegi Nichol] Canadian Nation 1.2 (Apr. 1928).
MacLeod, Pegi Nicol. "Five O'Clock [Illustration]." Canadian Forum 16.189 (Oct. 1936): 17.
MacLeod, Pegi Nicol. "Fredericton." Canadian Art 1.1 (Oct. 1943): 35.
MacLeod, Pegi Nicol. "Merry Christmas." Canadian Forum 16.191 (Dec. 1936): 13.
MacLeod, Pegi Nicol. "Recording the Women's Services." Canadian Art 2.2 (Dec. 1949): 48–51.
MacLeod, Pegi Nicol. "Rouault. By Edward Alden Jewell. New York: Hyperion Press [Review]." Canadian Art 10.2 (Feb-Mar. 1947): 83.
MacLeod, Pegi Nicol. "Where Forgotten Gods Sleep." Canadian National Railways Magazine 17.3 (Mar. 1931): 25.

References 

Canadian women painters
Canadian war artists
1904 births
1949 deaths
World War II artists
20th-century Canadian women artists
20th-century Canadian painters
People from Perth County, Ontario
Artists from Ontario
Canadian watercolourists
Women watercolorists
Deaths from cancer in New York (state)
École des beaux-arts de Montréal alumni
Persons of National Historic Significance (Canada)
Lisgar Collegiate Institute alumni
Canadian expatriates in France
Canadian expatriates in the United States